Events from the year 1861 in the United Kingdom.

Incumbents
 Monarch – Victoria
 Prime Minister – Henry John Temple, 3rd Viscount Palmerston (Liberal)
 Parliament – 18th

Events
 1 January – first steam-powered merry-go-round recorded, in Bolton.
 15 February – about 350 convicts held on St Mary's Island at Chatham Dockyard take over their prison in a riot.
 20 February – storms damage the Crystal Palace in London and cause the collapse of the steeple of Chichester Cathedral.
 21 to 26 March – major fire in Southwark destroys several buildings.
 30 March – William Crookes announces his discovery of thallium.
 7 April – United Kingdom census. The population is more than double that of 1801.
 12 April – American Civil War breaks out, leading to Lancashire Cotton Famine (1861–1865).
 13 May – British government resolves to remain neutral in the American Civil War.
 17 May – Thomas Cook runs the first package holiday from London to Paris.
 July – outbreak of yellow fever onboard paddle frigate HMS Firebrand in the West Indies kills 52.
 31 July – Bankruptcy and Insolvency Act codifies company law.
 6 August – Criminal Law Consolidation Acts (drafted by Charles Sprengel Greaves) granted Royal Assent, generally coming into effect on 1 November. The death penalty is limited to murder, embezzlement, piracy, high treason and to acts of arson perpetrated upon docks or ammunition depots; the age of consent is codified as twelve. The Home Secretary takes over the power to reprieve or commute sentences from the judiciary and Privy Council.
 Accessories and Abettors Act, codifying the law on accessories and abettors.
 Coinage Offences Act, codifying the law on counterfeiting of coins.
 Criminal Statutes Repeal Act.
 Forgery Act, codifying the law on forgery.
 Larceny Act, codifying the law on larceny and related offences.
 Malicious Damage Act, codifying the law on criminal damage.
 Offences against the Person Act, codifying the law on violent offence against the person and abortion and creating the offence of "causing bodily harm by wanton or furious driving".
 27 August – last execution in Britain for attempted murder – Martin Doyle in Chester.
 16 September – Post Office Savings Bank opens.
 24 October – HMS Warrior, the world's first ocean-going (all) iron-hulled armoured battleship is completed and commissioned.
 8 November – Trent Affair: Union captained ship USS San Jacinto intercepts the British mail packet Trent at sea and removes two Confederate diplomats.
 25 November – a tenement collapses in the Old Town, Edinburgh, killing 35 with 15 survivors.
 1 December – Trent Affair: British government dispatches its response, partly drafted by The Prince Consort.

Undated

 James Clerk Maxwell demonstrates the principle of three-colour photography (see picture).
 British Empire establishes bases in Lagos to stop the slave trade.
 Perpetual Truce of Peace and Friendship signed between Bahrain and the U.K.
 The Greek Orthodox Church of the Annunciation, Manchester in Salford is consecrated as the oldest purpose-built Greek Orthodox Church in England.
 Construction commences on Royal Museum in Edinburgh.
 Crimean War Memorial unveiled in London, including sculptures of Other Ranks.
 William Morris founds the influential furnishing company, Morris, Marshall, Faulkner & Co.

Publications
 Mrs Beeton's Book of Household Management.
 Charles Dickens' novel Great Expectations complete in book form.
 George Eliot's novel Silas Marner.
 F. T. Palgrave's anthology Golden Treasury of English Songs and Lyrics, 1st edition.
 Charles Reade's novel The Cloister and the Hearth.
 Anthony Trollope's novels Framley Parsonage (book form) and Orley Farm (serialisation begins).
 Mrs Henry Wood's 'sensation novel' East Lynne.
 The anthology Hymns Ancient and Modern. This includes the setting "Eventide" by the music editor William Henry Monk for the hymn Abide with Me.

Births

 22 January – Maurice Hewlett, historical novelist, poet and essayist (died 1923)
 15 February
 Halford Mackinder, geographer (died 1947)
 Alfred North Whitehead, mathematician (died 1947)
 19 February – Henry Horne, 1st Baron Horne, general (died 1929)
 23 April – Edmund Allenby, 1st Viscount Allenby, soldier, administrator (died 1936)
 12 June – William Attewell, cricketer (died 1927)
 17 June – Sidney Jones, musical comedy composer (died 1946)
 19 June – Douglas Haig, 1st Earl Haig, soldier (died 1928)
 20 June – Frederick Hopkins, biochemist, recipient of the Nobel Prize for Physiology or Medicine (died 1947)
 9 July – William Burrell, Scottish shipowner and art collector (died 1958)
 4 August – Henry Head, neurologist (died 1940)
 10 August – Almroth Wright, bacteriologist, immunologist (died 1947)  
 2 September – Arthur Beresford Pite, architect (died 1934)
 23 September – Mary Elizabeth Coleridge, poet and novelist (died 1907)
 12 October – Agnes Jekyll, née Graham, artist, writer on domestic matters and philanthropist (died 1937)
 16 October – J. B. Bury, historian (died 1927)
 23 October  – Margaret McKellar, Scottish-born Canadian medical missionary (died 1941)
 8 November – William Price Drury, novelist, playwright and Royal Marines officer (died 1949)
 10 November – Amy Levy, novelist and essayist (died 1889)
 18 December – Lionel Monckton, musical comedy composer (died 1924)
 19 December – Constance Garnett, née Black, literary translator (died 1946)

Deaths

 17 January – Fanny Fleming, actress (born 1796)
 29 January – Catherine Gore, novelist and dramatist (born 1798)
 6 February – Bulkeley Bandinel, scholar-librarian (born 1781)
 7 February –  John Brown, geographer (born 1797)
 16 March – Princess Victoria of Saxe-Coburg-Saalfeld, Duchess of Kent, mother of Queen Victoria (born 1786 in Germany)
 8 April – John Bartholomew, Sr., Scottish cartographer (born 1805)
 24 April – Sir Hedworth Williamson, 7th Baronet, politician (born 1797)
 13 June – Henry Gray, anatomist (smallpox) (born 1827)
 18 June – Eaton Hodgkinson, structural engineer (born 1789)
 29 June – Elizabeth Barrett Browning, poet (born 1806)
 6 July – Sir Francis Palgrave, historian (born 1788)
 29 July – Richard Temple-Nugent-Brydges-Chandos-Grenville, 2nd Duke of Buckingham and Chandos, politician (born 1797)
 3 September – Ernest Edgcumbe, 3rd Earl of Mount Edgcumbe, politician (born 1797)
 4 October – Archibald Montgomerie, 13th Earl of Eglinton, noble (born 1812)
 5 October – William Ranwell, marine painter (born 1797)
 13 October – Sir William Cubitt, civil engineer (born 1785)
 21 October – Edward Dickinson Baker, United States Senator from Oregon, 1860–1861 (born 1811 in the U.K.)
 13 November
 Arthur Hugh Clough, poet (born 1819)
 Sir John Forbes, royal physician (born 1787)
 John Hodgetts-Foley, politician (born 1797)
 10 December – Thomas Southwood Smith, physician and sanitary reformer (born 1788)
 14 December – Albert, Prince Consort, spouse of Queen Victoria (born 1819 in Germany)

See also
 1861 in Scotland

References

 
Years of the 19th century in the United Kingdom